The 2012 Toronto Blue Jays season was the 36th season of Major League Baseball's Toronto Blue Jays franchise, and the 23rd full season of play (24th overall) at the Rogers Centre. Their opening game was played on April 5 against the Cleveland Indians in Cleveland. The Blue Jays finished 73–89, in fourth place in the American League East.

New identity
On November 18, 2011, the Blue Jays unveiled a new logo and uniforms for the 2012 season. The logo and all-white home uniform bear a strong resemblance to the original logo and home uniforms, used from 1977 to 1996. The grey road uniform resembles those used from 1989 to 1996, and the alternate royal blue jersey—to be used for home and road games—resembles those used from 1994 to 1996, as well as the batting practice jerseys used from 1982 to 1996.

Spring training
The Blue Jays had a 24–7 win–loss record in spring training, their .774 winning percentage being the best of all MLB teams during pre-season. One of their games finished tied and was therefore not included in the standings.

Regular season

Standings

American League East

American League Wild Card

Records vs opponents

2012 Draft picks

The 2012 Major League Baseball draft was held on June 4–6.

 * The Blue Jays received the 22nd pick as compensation for unsigned 2011 draft pick Tyler Beede
 * The Blue Jays received the 50th pick as compensation for loss of free agent Frank Francisco
 * The Blue Jays received the 58th pick as compensation for loss of free agent Jon Rauch
 * The Blue Jays received the 60th pick as compensation for loss of free agent Jose Molina

Roster

Top prospects

* According to Baseball America Top 100 Prospects

* According to 2012 Prospect Watch

* Top 10 Blue Jays prospects via Baseball America

Game log

|-  style="text-align:center; background:#bfb;"
| 1 || April 5 || @ Indians || 7–4 (16) || Pérez (1–0) || Asencio (0–1) || – || 43,190 || 1–0 || +½
|-  style="text-align:center; background:#bfb;"
| 2 || April 7 || @ Indians || 7–4 (12) || Janssen (1–0) || Sipp (0–1) || – || 18,842 || 2–0 || – 
|-  style="text-align:center; background:#fbb;"
| 3 || April 8 || @ Indians || 3–4 || Lowe (1–0) || Carreño (0–1) || Perez (1) || 10,518 || 2–1 || 1
|-  style="text-align:center; background:#fbb;"
| 4 || April 9 || Red Sox || 2–4 || Atchison (1–0) || Santos (0–1) || Aceves (1)  || 48,473 ||  2–2  || 1½
|-  style="text-align:center; background:#bfb;"
| 5 || April 10 || Red Sox || 7–3 || Drabek (1–0) || Bard (0–1)  ||  –  || 26,357 || 3–2 || ½
|-  style="text-align:center; background:#bfb;"
| 6 || April 11 || Red Sox || 3–1 || Romero (1–0) || Lester (0–1)|| Santos (1) || 25,285 || 4–2 || ½
|-  style="text-align:center; background:#fbb;"
| 7 || April 13 || Orioles || 5–7 || O'Day (1–0) || Oliver (0–1) || Johnson (3) || 21,988|| 4–3 || –
|-  style="text-align:center; background:#fbb;"
| 8 || April 14 || Orioles || 4–6 || Ayala (1–0) || Cordero (0–1) || Johnson (4) || 28,355|| 4–4 || 1
|-  style="text-align:center; background:#bfb;"
| 9 || April 15 || Orioles || 9–2 || Drabek (2–0) || Matusz (0–2) || – || 20,252 || 5–4 || –
|-  style="text-align:center; background:#bfb;"
| 10 || April 17 || Rays || 7–3 || Romero (2–0) || Niemann (0–2) || – || 15,331 || 6–4 || ½
|-  style="text-align:center; background:#fbb;"
| 11 || April 18 || Rays || 2–12 || Price (2–1) || Morrow (0–1) || – || 15,828|| 6–5 || ½
|-  style="text-align:center; background:#fbb;"
| 12 || April 19 || Rays || 4–9 || Hellickson (2–0) || Álvarez (0–1) || – || 18,976 || 6–6 || 1½
|-  style="text-align:center; background:#bfb;"
| 13 || April 20 || @ Royals || 4–3 || Pérez (2–0) || Holland (0–2) || Santos (2) || 23,065 || 7–6 || ½
|-  style="text-align:center; background:#bfb;"
| 14 || April 21 || @ Royals || 9–5 || Hutchison (1–0) ||Teaford (0–1) || – || 27,804 || 8–6 || ½
|-  style="text-align:center; background:#bfb;"
| 15 || April 22 || @ Royals || 5–3 || Romero (3–0) || Duffy (1–2) || Cordero (1) || 26,891 || 9–6 || –
|-  style="text-align:center; background:#bfb;"
| 16 || April 23 || @ Royals || 4–1 ||  Morrow (1–1) || Chen (0–2) ||  Cordero (2) || 13,267 || 10–6 || –
|-  style="text-align:center; background:#fbb;"
| 17 || April 24 || @ Orioles || 1–2 || Hunter (2–1) || Álvarez (0–2) || Strop (1) || 11,058 || 10–7 || –
|-  style="text-align:center; background:#fbb;"
| 18 || April 25 || @ Orioles || 0–3 || Hammel (3–0) || Drabek (2–1) || Strop (2) || 10,415 || 10–8 || 1
|-  style="text-align:center; background:#fbb;"
| 19 || April 26 || @ Orioles || 2–5 || O'Day (2–0) || Janssen (1–1) || Ayala (1) || 13,725 || 10–9 || 2
|-  style="text-align:center; background:#fbb;"
| 20 || April 27 || Mariners || 5–9 (10) || Furbush (2–1) || Pérez (2–1)  ||   || 24,303 || 10–10 || 3
|-  style="text-align:center; background:#bfb;"
| 21 || April 28 || Mariners || 7–0 || Morrow (2–1) || Millwood (0–2) ||   || 30,765 || 11–10 || 2
|-  style="text-align:center; background:#bfb;"
| 22 || April 29 || Mariners || 7–2 || Álvarez (1–2) || Vargas (3–2) ||   || 22,320 || 12–10 || 2
|-  style="text-align:center; background:#fbb;"
| 23 || April 30 || Rangers || 1–4 || Darvish (4–0) || Drabek (2–2) || Nathan (6) || 21,945 || 12–11 || 3
|-

|- style="text-align:center; background:#bfb;"
| 24 || May 1 || Rangers || 8–7 || Cordero (1–1) || Adams (0–1) ||   || 18,774 || 13–11 || 3
|- style="text-align:center; background:#bfb;"
| 25 || May 2 || Rangers || 11–5 || Romero (4–0) || Harrison (3–2) || || 25,123 || 14–11 || 3
|- style="text-align:center; background:#bfb;"
| 26 || May 3 || @ Angels || 5–0 || Morrow (3–1) || Haren (1–2) || || 28,359 || 15–11 || 3
|- style="text-align:center; background:#bfb;"
| 27 || May 4 || @ Angels || 4–0 || Álvarez (2–2) || Santana (0–6) ||   || 33,160 || 16–11 || 3
|- style="text-align:center; background:#fbb;"
| 28 || May 5 || @ Angels || 2–6 || Wilson (4–2) || Drabek (2–3) || || 39,018 || 16–12 || 3
|- style="text-align:center; background:#fbb;"
| 29 || May 6 || @ Angels || 3–4 || Williams (3–1) || Hutchison (1–1) || Hawkins (1) || 37,548 || 16–13 || 3½
|- style="text-align:center; background:#fbb;"
| 30 || May 8 || @ Athletics || 3–7 || Balfour (1–1) || Cordero (1–2) || || 10,784 || 16–14 || 3
|- style="text-align:center; background:#bfb"
| 31 || May 9 || @ Athletics || 5–2 || Morrow (4–1) || Ross (1–3) ||  Janssen (1) || 14,815 || 17–14 || 3
|- style="text-align:center; background:#bfb"
| 32 || May 10 || @ Twins || 6–2 || Álvarez (3–2) || Marquis (2-2) || || 31,438 || 18–14 || 2
|- style="text-align:center; background:#fbb;"
| 33 || May 11 || @ Twins || 6–7 || Blackburn (1–4) || Drabek (2–4) || Capps (6) || 33,387 || 18–15 || 3
|- style="text-align:center; background:#bfb;"
| 34 || May 12 || @ Twins || 2–1 || Hutchison (2–1) || Walters (0–1) || Janssen (2) || 38,820 || 19–15 || 3
|- style="text-align:center; background:#fbb;"
| 35 || May 13 || @ Twins || 3–4 || Diamond (2–0) || Romero (4–1) || Capps (7) || 36,889 || 19–16 || 3
|- style="text-align:center; background:#fbb;"
| 36 || May 14 || Rays || 1–7 || Ramos (1–0) || Morrow (4–2) || || 15,289 || 19–17 || 3
|- style="text-align:center; background:#fbb;"
| 37 || May 15 || Rays || 3–4 || Price (6–2) || Álvarez (3–3) || Rodney (11) || 15,612 || 19–18 || 4
|- style="text-align:center; background:#bfb;"
| 38 || May 16 || Yankees || 8–1 || Drabek (3–4) || Kuroda (3–5) || || 28,915 || 20–18 || 4
|- style="text-align:center; background:#bfb;"
| 39 || May 17 || Yankees || 4–1 || Hutchison (3–1) || Hughes (3–5)  || Janssen (3) || 31,266 || 21–18 || 4
|- style="text-align:center; background:#bfb;"
| 40 || May 18 || Mets || 14–5 || Romero (5–1) || Niese (2–2) || || 26,712 || 22–18 || 4
|- style="text-align:center; background:#bfb;"
| 41 || May 19 || Mets || 2–0 || Morrow (5–2) || Hefner (0–1) || || 34,962 || 23–18 || 4
|- style="text-align:center; background:#fbb;"
| 42 || May 20 || Mets || 5–6 || Gee (3–3) || Álvarez (3–4) || Francisco (10) || 41,867 || 23–19 || 4
|- style="text-align:center; background:#bfb;"
| 43 || May 21 || @ Rays || 6–2 || Drabek (4–4) || Hellickson (4–1) || || 10,844 || 24–19 || 3
|- style="text-align:center; background:#fbb;"
| 44 || May 22 || @ Rays || 5–8 || Davis (1–0) || Hutchison (3–2) || Rodney (14) || 12,307 || 24–20 || 4
|- style="text-align:center; background:#fbb;"
| 45 || May 23 || @ Rays || 4–5 (11) || McGee (1–1) || Oliver (0–2) || || 11,471 || 24–21 || 4
|- style="text-align:center; background:#fbb;"
| 46 || May 25 || @ Rangers || 3–14 || Holland (4–3) || Morrow (5–3) || || 46,789 || 24–22 || 5
|- style="text-align:center; background:#fbb;"
| 47 || May 26 || @ Rangers || 7–8 (13) || Tateyama (1–0) || Frasor (0–1) || || 47,430 || 24–23 || 5
|- style="text-align:center; background:#fbb;"
| 48 || May 27 || @ Rangers || 6–12 || Darvish (7–2) || Drabek (4–5) || || 46,637 || 24–24 || 5
|- style="text-align:center; background:#bfb;"
| 49 || May 28 || Orioles || 6–2 || Hutchison (4–2) || Hunter (2–3) || Janssen (4) || 16,575 || 25–24 || 4
|- style="text-align:center; background:#bfb;"
| 50 || May 29 || Orioles || 8–6 || Romero (6–1) || Arrieta (2–6) || || 17,352 || 26–24 || 3
|- style="text-align:center; background:#bfb;"
| 51 || May 30 || Orioles || 4–1 || Morrow (6–3) || Hammel (6–2) ||  Janssen (5) || 17,754 || 27–24 || 2
|-

|- style="text-align:center; background:#fbb;"
| 52 || June 1 || Red Sox || 2–7 || Buchholz (5–2) || Álvarez (3–5) || || 29,678 || 27–25 || 3
|- style="text-align:center; background:#fbb;"
| 53 || June 2 || Red Sox || 4–7 || Doubront (6–2) || Drabek (4–6) || Aceves (14) || 43,390 || 27–26 || 3
|- style="text-align:center; background:#bfb;"
| 54 || June 3 || Red Sox || 5–1 || Hutchison (5–2) || Bard (5–6) || || 41,925 || 28–26 || 3
|- style="text-align:center; background:#bfb;"
| 55 || June 5 || @ White Sox || 9–5 || Romero (7–1) || Humber (2–3) || || 23,107 || 29–26 || 2
|- style="text-align:center; background:#bfb;"
| 56 || June 6 || @ White Sox || 4–0 || Morrow (7–3) || Quintana (1–1) || || 25,672 || 30–26 || 2
|- style="text-align:center; background:#fbb;"
| 57 || June 7 || @ White Sox || 3–4 || Reed (1–1) || Cordero (1–3) || || 25,743 || 30–27 || 2
|- style="text-align:center; background:#fbb;"
| 58 || June 8 || @ Braves || 3–4 (10) || Martínez (3–1) || Cordero (1–4) || || 42,488 || 30–28 || 3
|- style="text-align:center; background:#fbb;"
| 59 || June 9 || @ Braves || 2–5 || Hanson (7–4) || Hutchison (5–3) || Kimbrel (18) || 32,819 || 30–29 || 4
|- style="text-align:center; background:#bfb;"
| 60 || June 10 || @ Braves || 12–4 ||  Villanueva (1–0) || Hernández (1–1) || || 20,222 || 31–29 || 4
|- style="text-align:center; background:#fbb;"
| 61 || June 11 || Nationals || 3–6 || Jackson (3–3) || Morrow (7–4) || || 18,513 || 31–30 || 4½
|- style="text-align:center; background:#fbb;"
| 62 || June 12 || Nationals || 2–4 || Wang (2–2) || Álvarez (3–6) || Clippard (9) || 22,538 || 31–31 || 5½
|- style="text-align:center; background:#fbb;"
| 63 || June 13 || Nationals || 2–6 || Strasburg (8–1) || Drabek (4–7) ||  || 41,667 || 31–32 || 6½
|- style="text-align:center; background:#bfb;"
| 64 || June 15 || Phillies || 3–0 || Villanueva (2–0) || Worley (3–3) || Janssen (6) || 28,266 || 32–32 || 6½
|- style="text-align:center; background:#bfb;"
| 65 || June 16 || Phillies || 6–5 (10) || Cordero (2–4) || Savery (0–2) || || 42,070 || 33–32 || 6½
|- style="text-align:center; background:#bfb;"
| 66 || June 17 || Phillies || 6–2 || Cecil (1–0) || Kendrick (2–7) || || 45,060 || 34–32 || 6½
|- style="text-align:center; background:#fbb;"
| 67 || June 18 || @ Brewers || 6–7 || Loe (4–2) || Coello (0–1) || Axford (12) || 32,223 || 34–33 || 7½
|- style="text-align:center; background:#bfb;"
| 68 || June 19 || @ Brewers || 10–9 || Oliver (1–2) || Axford (1–4) || Janssen (7) || 36,334 || 35–33 || 6½
|- style="text-align:center; background:#fbb;"
| 69 || June 20 || @ Brewers || 3–8 || Gallardo (6–5) || Carreño (0–2) || || 33,077 || 35–34 || 6½
|- style="text-align:center; background:#bfb;"
| 70 || June 22 || @ Marlins || 12–5 || Romero (8–1) || Sánchez (3–6) || || 22,387 || 36–34 || 5½
|- style="text-align:center; background:#bfb;"
| 71 || June 23 || @ Marlins || 7–1 || Oliver (2–2) || Cishek (4–1) || || 24,448 || 37–34 || 5½
|- style="text-align:center;  background:#fbb;"
| 72 || June 24 || @ Marlins || 0–9 || Buehrle (6–8) || Chavez (0–1) || || 27,888 || 37–35 || 6½
|- style="text-align:center; background:#bfb;"
| 73 || June 25 || @ Red Sox || 9–6 || Álvarez (4–6) || Doubront (8–4) || Janssen (8) || 37,208 || 38–35 || 6½
|- style="text-align:center; background:#fbb;"
| 74 || June 26 || @ Red Sox || 1–5 || Miller (2–0) || Pérez (2–2) || || 37,755 || 38–36 || 7½
|- style="text-align:center; background:#fbb;"
| 75 || June 27 || @ Red Sox || 4–10 || Lester (5–5) || Romero (8–2) || || 37,744 || 38–37 || 8½
|- style="text-align:center; background:#fbb;"
| 76 || June 28 || Angels || 7–9 || Haren (6–7) || Cecil (1–1) || Frieri (10) || 24,668 || 38–38 || 8½
|- style="text-align:center; background:#bfb;"
| 77 || June 29 || Angels || 7–5 || Cordero (3–4) || Walden (2–2) || Janssen (9) || 24,538 || 39–38 || 7½
|- style="text-align:center; background:#bfb;"
| 78 || June 30 || Angels || 11–2 || Álvarez (5–6) || Richards (2–1) || || 29,287 || 40–38 || 7½
|-

|- style="text-align:center; background:#fbb;"
| 79 || July 1 || Angels || 6–10 || Isringhausen (3–0) || Cordero (3–5) || || 34,853 || 40–39 || 8½ 
|- style="text-align:center;"
|- style="text-align:center; background:#fbb;"
| 80 || July 2 || Royals || 3–11 || Teaford (1–1) || Romero (8–3) || || 17,127 || 40–40 || 8½ 
|- style="text-align:center; background:#bfb;"
| 81 || July 3 || Royals || 6–3 || Cecil (2–1) || Mazzaro (3–3)  || Janssen (10) || 15,516 || 41–40 || 7½ 
|- style="text-align:center; background:#bfb;"
| 82 || July 4 || Royals || 4–1 || Villanueva (3–0) || Mendoza (3–5) || Janssen (11) || 17,831 || 42–40 || 7½ 
|- style="text-align:center; background:#fbb;"
| 83 || July 5 || Royals || 6–9 || Hochevar (6–8) || Álvarez (5–7) || Broxton (21) || 20,598 || 42–41 || 8 
|- style="text-align:center; background:#fbb;"
| 84 || July 6 || @ White Sox || 2–4 || Peavy (7–5) || Laffey (0–1) || Reed (13) || 27,129 || 42–42 || 9 
|- style="text-align:center; background:#fbb;"
| 85 || July 7 || @ White Sox || 0–2 || Floyd (7–8) || Romero (8–4) || Thornton (2) || 25,399 || 42–43 || 9½ 
|- style="text-align:center; background:#bfb;"
| 86 || July 8 || @ White Sox || 11–9 || Frasor (1–1) || Axelrod (0–2) || Janssen (12) || 27,190 || 43–43 || 9½ 
|- style="text-align:center; background:#fbb;"
| 87 || July 13 || Indians || 0–1 || Masterson (6–8) || Romero (8–5) || Perez (25) || 32,308 || 43–44 || 10½  
|- style="text-align:center; background:#bfb;"
| 88 || July 14 || Indians || 11–9 || Laffey (1–1) || Jiménez (8–8) || Janssen (13) || 32,517 || 44–44 || 10½ 
|- style="text-align:center; background:#bfb;"
| 89 || July 15 || Indians || 3–0 || Villanueva (4–0) || Lowe (8–7) || Oliver (1) || 26,407 || 45–44 || 9½ 
|- style="text-align:center; background:#fbb;"
| 90 || July 16 || @ Yankees || 3–6 || Robertson (1–3) || Loup (0–1) || Soriano (23) || 42,819 || 45–45 || 10½ 
|- style="text-align:center; background:#fbb;" 
| 91 || July 17 || @ Yankees || 1–6 || Sabathia (10–3) || Cecil (2–2) || Soriano (24) || 44,975 || 45–46 || 11½ 
|- style="text-align:center; background:#fbb;"
| 92 || July 18 || @ Yankees || 0–6 (7) || Kuroda (9–7)    || Romero (8–6) || || 45,986 || 45–47 || 12½ 
|- style="text-align:center; background:#bfb;"
| 93 || July 20 || @ Red Sox || 6–1 || Laffey (2–1) || Beckett (5–8) || || 38,093 || 46–47 || 11 
|- style="text-align:center; background:#bfb;"
| 94 || July 21 || @ Red Sox || 7–3 || Villanueva (5–0) || Cook (2–3) || || 38,170 || 47–47 || 10 
|- style="text-align:center; background:#bfb;"
| 95 || July 22 || @ Red Sox || 15–7 || Álvarez (6–7) || Lester (5–8) || || 37,737 || 48–47 || 9  
|- style="text-align:center; background:#fbb;"
| 96 || July 24 || Athletics || 2–7 || Blackley (3–2) || Cecil (2–3) || || 25,686 || 48–48 || 9½ 
|- style="text-align:center; background:#fbb;"
| 97 || July 25 || Athletics || 0–16 || Griffin (3–0) || Romero (8–7) || || 23,948 || 48–49 || 10½ 
|- style="text-align:center; background:#bfb;"
| 98 || July 26 || Athletics || 10–4 || Lyon (1–2) || Milone (9–7) || || 39,003 || 49–49 || 10 
|- style="text-align:center; background:#bfb;"
| 99 || July 27 || Tigers || 8–3 || Villanueva (6–0) || Porcello (7–6) || || 33,962 || 50–49 || 10 
|- style="text-align:center; background:#bfb;"
| 100 || July 28 || Tigers || 5–1 || Álvarez (7–7) || Sánchez (5–8) || || 41,832 || 51–49 || 9 
|- style="text-align:center; background:#fbb;"
| 101 || July 29 || Tigers || 1–4 || Fister (5–7) || Cecil (2–4) || Valverde (20) || 35,975 || 51–50 || 9 
|- style="text-align:center; background:#fbb;"
| 102 || July 30 || @ Mariners || 1–4 || Iwakuma (2–2) || Romero (8–8) || Luetge (1) || 22,443 || 51–51 || 9   
|- style="text-align:center; background:#fbb;"
| 103 || July 31 || @ Mariners || 2–7 || Vargas (12–7) || Laffey (2–2) || || 21,434 || 51–52 || 9
|-

|- style="text-align:center; background:#fbb;"
| 104 || August 1 || @ Mariners || 3–5 || Beavan (7–6) || Villanueva (6–1) || Wilhelmsen (15) || 22,537 || 51–53 || 10
|- style="text-align:center; background:#fbb;"
| 105 || August 2 || @ Athletics || 1–4 || Colón (8–8) || Álvarez (7–8) || Cook (11) || 10,823 || 51–54 || 10½ 
|- style="text-align:center; background:#fbb;"
| 106 || August 3 || @ Athletics || 4–5 (15) || Blackley (4–3) || Loup (0–2) || || 30,169 || 51–55 || 11½ 
|- style="text-align:center; background:#bfb;"
| 107 || August 4 || @ Athletics || 3–1 (11) || Chavez (1–1) || Blevins (4–1) || Oliver (2) || 17,121 || 52–55 || 10½
|- style="text-align:center; background:#bfb;"
| 108 || August 5 || @ Athletics || 6–5 || Laffey (3–2) || Milone (9–9) || Janssen (14) || 18,308 || 53–55 || 10½
|- style="text-align:center; background:#fbb;"
| 109 || August 7 || @ Rays || 1–4 || Shields (10–7) || Happ (7–10) || Rodney (33) || 13,823 || 53–56 || 10
|- style="text-align:center; background:#fbb;"
| 110 || August 8|| @ Rays || 2–3 || Cobb (6–8) || Villanueva (6–2) || Rodney (34) || 13,441 || 53–57 || 11
|- style="text-align:center; background:#fbb;"
| 111 || August 9 || @ Rays || 1–7 || Moore (9–7) || Álvarez (7–9) || || 23,462 || 53–58 || 12
|- style="text-align:center; background:#fbb;"
| 112 || August 10 || Yankees || 4–10 || García (6–5) || Romero (8–9) || || 41,610 || 53–59 || 13
|- style="text-align:center; background:#fbb;"
| 113 || August 11 || Yankees || 2–5 || Nova (11–6) || Laffey (3–3) || Soriano (28) || 45,582 || 53–60 || 14
|- style="text-align:center; background:#bfb;"
| 114 || August 12 || Yankees || 10–7 || Happ (8–10) || Hughes (11–10) || Janssen (15) || 43,924 || 54–60 || 13
|- style="text-align:center; background:#bfb;"
| 115 || August 13 || White Sox || 3–2 (11) || Delabar (3–1) || Séptimo (0–2) || || 16,828 || 55–60 || 13
|- style="text-align:center; background:#fbb;"
| 116 || August 14 || White Sox || 2–3 || Quintana (5–2) || Álvarez (7–10) || Reed (21) || 18,919 || 55–61 || 14
|- style="text-align:center; background:#fbb;"
| 117 || August 15 || White Sox || 5–9 || Floyd (9–9) || Romero (8–10) || || 20,119 || 55–62 || 15
|- style="text-align:center; background:#fbb;"
| 118 || August 16 || White Sox || 2–7 || Liriano (4–10) || Laffey (3–4) || || 19,855 || 55–63 || 15
|- style="text-align:center; background:#bfb;"
| 119 || August 17 || Rangers || 3–2 || Happ (9–10) || Darvish (12–9) || Janssen (16) || 26,816 || 56–63 || 15
|- style="text-align:center; background:#fbb;"
| 120 || August 18 || Rangers || 1–2 || Kirkman (1–2) || Villanueva (6–3) || Nathan (24) || 30,033 || 56–64 || 15
|- style="text-align:center; background:#fbb;"
| 121 || August 19 || Rangers || 2–11 || Harrison (14–7) || Álvarez (7–11) || || 35,701 || 56–65 || 16
|- style="text-align:center; background:#fbb;"
| 122 || August 21 || @ Tigers || 3–5 || Scherzer (13–6) || Romero (8–11) || Valverde (24) || 39,499 || 56–66 || 15½
|- style="text-align:center; background:#fbb;"
| 123 || August 22 || @ Tigers || 2–3 || Sánchez (7–10) || Laffey (3–5) || Valverde (25) || 37,225 || 56–67  || 15½
|- style="text-align:center; background:#fbb;"
| 124 || August 23 || @ Tigers || 2–3 (11) || Benoit (3–3) || Jenkins (0–1) || || 39,910 || 56–68 || 16
|- style="text-align:center; background:#fbb"
| 125 || August 24 || @ Orioles || 4–6 || Britton (3–1) || Villanueva (6–4) || Johnson (39) || 25,754 || 56–69 || 17
|- style="text-align:center; background:#fbb"
| 126 || August 25 || @ Orioles || 2–8 || Johnson (2–0) || Morrow (7–5) || || 25,082 || 56–70 || 17
|-  style="text-align:center; background:#bbb;"
|–|| August 26 || @ Orioles || colspan=6|Postponed (rain) Rescheduled for September 24|| 17½
|- style="text-align:center; background:#bfb"
| 127 || August 27 || @ Yankees || 8–7 (11) || Oliver (3–2) || Lowe (8–11) || || 42,962 || 57–70 || 16½
|- style="text-align:center; background:#fbb;"
| 128 || August 28 || @ Yankees || 1–2 || Hughes (13–11) || Romero (8–12) || Soriano (34) || 42,472 || 57–71 || 17½
|- style="text-align:center; background:#bfb;"
| 129 || August 29 || @ Yankees || 8–5 || Happ (10–10) || Sabathia (13–4) || Janssen (17) || 46,010 || 58–71 || 16½
|- style="text-align:center; background:#bfb;"
| 130 || August 30 || Rays || 2–0 || Villanueva (7–4) || Moore (10–8) || Janssen (18) || 22,711 || 59–71 || 16
|- style="text-align:center; background:#bfb;"
| 131 || August 31 || Rays || 2–1 || Morrow (8–5) || Hellickson (8–10) || Janssen (19) || 20,158 || 60–71 || 15
|-

|- style="text-align:center; background:#fbb;"
| 132 || September 1 || Rays || 4–5 || Davis (2–0) || Álvarez (7–12) || Rodney (40) || 20,478 || 60–72 || 16
|- style="text-align:center; background:#fbb;"
| 133 || September 2 || Rays || 4–9 || Price (17–5) || Romero (8–13) || || 18,568 || 60–73 || 16
|- style="text-align:center; background:#fbb;"
| 134 || September 3 || Orioles || 0–4 || Saunders (7–11) || Happ (10–11) || || 17,220 || 60–74 || 16
|- style="text-align:center; background:#fbb;"
| 135 || September 4 || Orioles || 0–12 || Britton (5–1) || Villanueva (7–5) || || 13,556 || 60–75 || 16
|- style="text-align:center; background:#bfb;"
| 136 || September 5 || Orioles  || 6–4 || Delabar (4–1) || González (6–4) || || 14,458 || 61–75 || 16
|- style="text-align:center; background:#bfb;"
| 137 || September 7 || @ Red Sox || 7–5 || Álvarez (8–12) || Doubront (10–8) || || 37,156 || 62–75 || 15½
|- style="text-align:center; background:#bfb;"
| 138 || September 8 || @ Red Sox || 9–2 || Lincoln (5–2) || Matsuzaka (1–5) || || 37,107 || 63–75 || 14½
|- style="text-align:center; background:#bfb;"
| 139 || September 9 || @ Red Sox || 4–3 || Lyon (2–2) || Buchholz (11–6) || Janssen (20) || 37,226 || 64–75 || 14½
|- style="text-align:center; background:#fbb;"
| 140 || September 11 || Mariners || 3–4 || Ramírez (1–2)  || Morrow (8–6) || Wilhelmsen (25) || 12,935 || 64–76 || 14½
|- style="text-align:center; background:#fbb;"
| 141 || September 12 || Mariners || 2–3 || Millwood (6–12) || Romero (8–14) || Wilhelmsen (26) || 13,519 || 64–77 || 15½
|- style="text-align:center; background:#bfb;"
| 142 || September 13 || Mariners || 8–3 || Álvarez (9–12) || Hernández (13–8) || || 13,756 || 65–77 || 15½
|- style="text-align:center; background:#fbb;"
| 143 || September 14 || Red Sox || 5–8 || Carpenter (1–0) || Oliver (3–3) || Bailey (3) || 21,888 || 65–78 || 15½
|- style="text-align:center; background:#fbb;"
| 144 || September 15 || Red Sox || 2–3 || Breslow (3–0) || Delabar (4–2) || Bailey (4) || 27,325 || 65–79 || 16½
|- style="text-align:center; background:#bfb;"
| 145 || September 16 || Red Sox || 5–0 || Lyon (3–2) || Lester (9–12) || || 21,698 || 66–79 || 16½
|-  style="text-align:center; background:#bbb;"
| – || September 18 ||@ Yankees  ||colspan=7| Postponed (rain) Rescheduled for September 19 
|- style="text-align:center; background:#fbb;"
| 146 || September 19 || @ Yankees || 2–4 || Pettitte (4–3) || Álvarez (9–13) || Soriano (41) || 39,859 || 66–80 || 17½
|- style="text-align:center; background:#fbb;"
| 147 || September 19 || @ Yankees || 1–2 || Eppley (1–2) || Delabar (4–3) || Soriano (42) || 39,997 || 66–81 || 18½
|- style="text-align:center; background:#fbb;"
| 148 || September 20 || @ Yankees || 7–10 || Hughes (16–12) || Laffey (3–6) || Robertson (2) || 40,511 || 66–82 || 19½
|- style="text-align:center; background:#fbb;"
| 149 || September 21 || @ Rays || 1–12 || Shields (15–9) || Villanueva (7–6) || || 14,187 || 66–83 || 20½
|- style="text-align:center; background:#fbb;"
| 150 || September 22 || @ Rays || 5–11 || Badenhop (3–2) || Morrow (8–7) || || 15,699 || 66–84 || 21½
|- style="text-align:center; background:#fbb;"
| 151 || September 23 || @ Rays || 0–3 || Hellickson (9–10) || Jenkins (0–2) || Rodney (44) || 18,985 || 66–85 || 21½
|-  style="text-align:center; background:#fbb;"
| 153 || September 24 || @ Orioles || 1–4 || Johnson (4–0) || Álvarez (9–14) || Johnson (48) || || 66–86 || 22½
|-  style="text-align:center; background:#cfc;"
| 154 || September 24 || @ Orioles || 9–5 || Romero (9–14) || Chen (12–10) || || 31,015 || 67–86 || 22
|- style="text-align:center; background:#cfc;"
| 154 || September 25 || @ Orioles || 4–0 || Laffey (4–6) || Saunders (8–13) || || 30,205 || 68–86 || 21
|- style="text-align:center; background:#fbb;"
| 155 || September 26 || @ Orioles || 2–12 || González (8–4) || Villanueva (7–7) || || 26,513 || 68–87 || 22
|- style="text-align:center; background:#cfc;"
| 156 || September 27 || Yankees || 6–0 || Morrow (9–7) || Nova (12–8) || || 23,060 || 69–87 || 21
|- style="text-align:center; background:#fbb;"
| 157 || September 28 || Yankees || 4–11 || Kuroda (15–11) || Jenkins (0–3) || || 25,785 || 69–88 || 22
|- style="text-align:center; background:#cfc;"
| 158 || September 29 || Yankees || 3–2 || Hill (1–0) || Pettitte (5–4) || Janssen (21) || 36,139 || 70–88 || 21
|- style="text-align:center; background:#fbb;"
| 159 || September 30 || Yankees || 6–9 || Logan (7–2) || Oliver (3–4) || || 31,418 || 70–89 || 22
|-

|- style="text-align:center; background:#cfc;"
| 160 || October 1 || Twins || 6–5 (10) || Lyon (4–2) || Duensing (4–12) || || 12,359 || 71–89 || 22
|- style="text-align:center; background:#cfc;"
| 161 || October 2 || Twins || 4–3 || Jenkins (1–3) || Swarzak (3–6) || Janssen (22) || 13,930 || 72–89 || 22
|- style="text-align:center; background:#cfc;"
| 162 || October 3 || Twins || 2–1 || Morrow (10–7) || Diamond (12–9) || Lyon (1) || 19,769 || 73–89 || 22
|-

Honours and awards
All-Star Game
 José Bautista, 3rd selection
Home Run Derby
 José Bautista, 2nd selection – 2nd-place finish
Player of the Week
 J. P. Arencibia – May 14–20 
Player of the Month
 José Bautista – June

Farm system

LEAGUE CHAMPIONS: Vancouver

References

External links
2012 Toronto Blue Jays season at Baseball Reference

Toronto Blue Jays seasons
Toronto Blue Jays
2012 in Canadian sports
2012 in Toronto